Madhukar Vasudev Dhond (M. V. Dhond, In Devanagari: मधुकर वासुदेव धोंड, म. वा. धोंड) (3 October 1914 – 5 December 2007) was a literary and art critic from Maharashtra, India.

He wrote in Marathi on  Dnyaneshwar, Namdev, Tukaram, Ramdas, Vitthal, Raghunath Dhondo Karve, Ram Ganesh Gadkari, Bal Sitaram Mardhekar, Dattatraya Ganesh Godse,  Anandi Gopal Joshi, Ranjit Desai's novel Swami, Vijay Tendulkar's play Sakharam Binder, and many other topics.

Dhond received in 1997 a Sahitya Akademi Award for his book Jnaneshwaritil Laukik Srushti.

Authorship

 The Evolution of Khyāl
 Aisa Witevara Dewa Kothe! (Rajhans Prakashan, 2001)
 Tarīhi Yeto Wasa Phulānnā (Rajhans Prakashan, 1999)
 Jalyatil Chandra (Rajhans Prakashan. 1994)
 Jnaneshwaritil Laukik Srishti (Mauj Prakashan, 1991)
 Chandra Chavathicha (Mauj Prakashan, 1987)
 Dnyaneshwari: Swarup, Tatvadnyan Ani Kavya (Majestic Book Stall, 1980)
 Marathi Lavani (Mauj Prakashan, 1956)

References

External links
 Books Authored by M. V. Dhond
 Introduction to some of Dhond's work
 M. V. Dhond dies

Indian literary critics
Marathi-language writers
1914 births
2007 deaths
Indian atheists
Recipients of the Sahitya Akademi Award in Marathi